Oakland – Jack London Square station is a train station in Jack London Square of Oakland, California, United States. The station is served by Amtrak's Capitol Corridor, Coast Starlight, and San Joaquins trains. Through Amtrak Thruway buses, this station is one of two that serves San Francisco, the other being Emeryville.

It is officially named Oakland – Jack London Square / C. L. Dellums Station after C. L. Dellums, co-founder of the Brotherhood of Sleeping Car Porters. 

Of the 74 California stations served by Amtrak, Oakland was the tenth-busiest in FY2012, boarding or de-training an average of about 1,142 passengers daily.

History

The station opened on May 22, 1995, as a replacement for 16th Street Station, which had been severely damaged in the 1989 Loma Prieta earthquake. A building next to the old station was used as the temporary stop until August 5, 1994. Southern Pacific's downtown station on the north side of 1st Street between Franklin Street and Broadway was a passenger stop until Oakland–San Jose service ended in 1960.

With its opening, Jack London Square inherited 16th Street Station's longtime role as the western terminus for the California Zephyr. Nearby Emeryville had temporarily been the western terminus from 1994 to 1995. Due to the station's location, westbound trains had to execute a reverse move along street running tracks to reach the wye at West Oakland. For this reason, the Zephyr was cut back to Emeryville in 1997.

The station's official name is "Oakland – Jack London Square / C. L. Dellums Station," named for the surrounding Jack London Square area, itself named after writer Jack London, and for C. L. Dellums, a longtime Oakland resident and the co-founder of the Brotherhood of Sleeping Car Porters; a statue of Dellums stands outside the station.

The station is owned by the Port of Oakland. The tracks along 1st Street are owned by Union Pacific Railroad.

Platforms and tracks

Connections
Jack London Square station is served by AC Transit's route 12 which provides daily service between Downtown Oakland and West Berkeley. 

The station is the western terminus for the City of Oakland's Broadway Shuttle, a free route on Broadway between Jack London Square and Grand Avenue. Shuttles are operated by AC Transit and operate only on weekdays.

Most Amtrak Thruway buses to and from San Francisco connect at Emeryville, as Jack London Square is further from the San Francisco–Oakland Bay Bridge. However, Oakland is the San Francisco connection point for passengers on the southern half of the Coast Starlight, as well as for some Thruway buses that run along the coast to Southern California.

References

External links

Oakland–Jack London Square – Capitol Corridor

Amtrak stations in Alameda County, California
Bus stations in Alameda County, California
Jack London Square
Railway stations in the United States opened in 1995